Henry is both a surname and a masculine given name. Notable people with the name Hen or Hens include:

Surnames:
Coel Hen, Semi-legendary king of Sub-Roman Britain
Gwilym ab Ieuan Hen (fl. c. 1440-1480), Welsh poet
Jorge Peña Hen (1928-1973), Chilean composer and academic
Józef Hen (born 1923), Polish novelist, essayist, playwright, screenwriter and reporter 
Llywarch Hen, sixth century prince of the kingdom of Rheged
Tal Hen (born 1979), Israeli footballer
Tudur Hen (died 1311), Welsh aristocrat
Yehezkel Hen (1882-1952), Israeli politician
Zerahiah ben Shealtiel Ḥen (fl. late 13th century), Spanish Jewish physician, philosopher, translator and Hebraist
Pascal Hens (born 1980), German team handball player
Thorsten Hens (born 1961), German economist

Given name:
Hen Azriel (born 1988), Israeli footballer
Hen Ezra (born 1989), Israeli footballer
Hen Pearce (1777-1809), English bare knuckle prizefighter
Hen Reuven (born 1992), Israeli footballer
Hen Sophal (born 1958), Cambodian artist

See also
Harald III Hen (c. 1040-1080), King of Denmark
Richard Henshall, nicknamed "Hen", a British musician

Masculine given names